There are two National Estuarine Research Reserves called Chesapeake Bay National Estuarine Research Reserve in the United States:

Chesapeake Bay National Estuarine Research Reserve (Maryland)
Chesapeake Bay National Estuarine Research Reserve (Virginia)